Solar All Access (formerly known as Solar Sports PPV) is a Philippines and Asian non-commercial pay-per-view sports subscription service of Solar Entertainment Corporation which features live sports broadcasts via satellite. It includes the boxing matches of Manny Pacquiao, yearly soccer matches of FIFA World Cup, the Olympics competitions and wrestling matches of WWE, specially on Pay-Per-Views. It is available on SkyCable channel 99 (SD), 195 (HD) and Cignal channel 199 (SD), 299 (HD). PPV viewing is also available to the public in gymnasiums, cinemas, restaurants, pubs and hotels in the Philippines.

See also
Solar Entertainment Corporation
Kapamilya Box Office

Television networks in the Philippines
Solar Entertainment Corporation channels
English-language television stations in the Philippines
Television channels and stations established in 2002
2002 establishments in the Philippines
 Pay-per-view television services